HumungousFungusAmongus is the second album released by New Jersey hardcore punk band Adrenalin O.D. It was first released in 1986 on vinyl through the band's label Buy on Records. The album was reissued on CD by Relapse Records in 2004.

The album continues the mix of fast paced hardcore and mid-tempo melodic punk that was shown on their debut The Wacky Hi-Jinks of Adrenalin O.D..

Track listing

Personnel
 Paul Richard - Lead Vocals, Guitar
 Bruce Wingate - Guitar
 Jack Steeples - Bass
 Dave Scott - Drums

Production
 Producer - Adrenalin O.D.
 Engineer - Danny Grigsby
 Front Cover Artwork - Bruce Wingate
 Back cover Artwork - Angel Izquierdo
 Photography - Ron Akiyama
 Art Direction - AVR Composition Union

References

1986 albums
Adrenalin O.D. albums